R513 road may refer to:
 R513 road (Ireland)
 R513 (South Africa)